Schmied is a surname of German origin. Its meaning is derived from the German word Schmied, which is a smith (of tin, gold, silver, or other metal). Common variants are Schmidt, Schmitt, and Schmitz.

People 
 Wieland der Schmied ("Wieland the Smith"), a draft by Richard Wagner for an opera libretto based on the Germanic legend
 Uli Schmied (born 1947), a German rower
 Kenneth Allen Schmied (1911–1973), a Republican, served as Mayor of Louisville, Kentucky
 Kurt Schmied (1926–2007), a goalkeeper for First Vienna FC and Austria national football team

References 

German words and phrases
German-language surnames
Occupational surnames